Don Lorenzo may refer to:

 Don Lorenzo (film), a 1952 Italian film
 Don Lorenzo, Bolivia, a town in Santa Cruz Department, Bolivia